In arithmetic geometry, the Bombieri–Lang conjecture is an unsolved problem conjectured by Enrico Bombieri and Serge Lang about the Zariski density of the set of rational points of an algebraic variety of general type.

Statement

The general form of the Bombieri–Lang conjecture states that if  is a positive-dimensional algebraic variety of general type defined over a number field , then the  points of  do not form a dense set in the Zariski topology.

History
The Bombieri–Lang conjecture was independently posed by Enrico Bombieri and Serge Lang. In a 1980 lecture at the University of Chicago, Enrico Bombieri posed a problem about the degeneracy of rational points for surfaces of general type. Independently in a series of papers starting in 1971, Serge Lang conjectured a more general relation between the distribution of rational points and algebraic hyperbolicity, formulated in the "refined form" of the Bombieri–Lang conjecture.

Generalizations and implications
The Bombieri–Lang conjecture is an analogue for surfaces of Faltings's theorem, which states that algebraic curves of genus greater than one only have finitely many rational points.

If true, the Bombieri–Lang conjecture would resolve the Erdős–Ulam problem, as it would imply that there do not exist dense subsets of the Euclidean plane all of whose pairwise distances are rational.

References

Diophantine geometry
Unsolved problems in geometry
Conjectures